Jan Per Gösta Mårtenson (born 14 February 1933) is a Swedish diplomat who is also famous as the author of some fifty Swedish crime novels.

Biography
Mårtenson has served as Head of the Secretariat for the King of Sweden many years. Jan Mårtenson  was also the Under-Secretary-General of the United Nations and later he held the position of Director-General at the UN Office at Geneva for several years.

Later Jan Mårtenson has served as Deputy Secretary-General of the UN and head of the UN's European headquarters in Geneva. 
In his free time he writes novels. The main character of most of his crime novels is the fictional antique dealer Johan Kristian Homan.

Crime novels (Swedish titles) 
 Helgeandsmordet (1973) -  Invitation au suicide, Paris, Librairie des Champs-Élysées, 1978
 Drakguldet (1974) - L’Or du dragon, Paris, Librairie des Champs-Élysées, 1982
 Demonerna (1975)
 Häxhammaren (1976)
 Döden går på museum (1977)
 Döden går på cirkus (1978)
 Vinprovarna (1979) - Death calls on the witches 
 Djävulens hand (1980)
 Döden gör en tavla (1981)
 Middag med döden (1982)
 Vampyren (1983)
 Guldmakaren (1984)
 Häxmästaren (1985)
 Rosor från döden (1986)
 Den röda näckrosen (1987)
 Neros bägare (1988)
 Mord i Venedig (1989)
 Akilles häl (1990)
 Ramses hämnd (1991)
 Midas hand (1992)
 Gamens öga (1993)
 Tsarens guld (1994)
 Karons färja (1995)
 Caesars örn (1996)
 Högt spel (1997)
 Det svarta guldet  (1998)
 Häxan (1999)
 Mord på Mauritius (2000)
 Ikaros flykt (2001)
 Mord ombord (2002)
 Dödligt svek (2003)
 Ostindiefararen (2004)
 Döden går på auktion (2005)
 Den kinesiska trädgården (2006)
 Spionen (2007)
 Dödssynden (2008)
 Palatsmordet (2009)
 Mord i Havanna (2010)
 Safari med döden (2011)
 Mord i blått (2012)
 Jubileumsmord (2012)
 Den grekiska hjälmen (2013)
 Juvelskrinet (2014)
 Medicis ring (2015)
 Silverapostlarna (2016)
 Elakt spel (2017)
 Den engelske kusinen (2018)

Novels under the signature Mårten Janson

About Jonas Berg 
 Telegrammet från San José (1971) 
 Tre Skilling Banco (1971) 
 Nobelpristagaren och döden (1972)

Other novels 
 Släkten är bäst (1978)
 Utsikt från min trappa (1982)
 Mord och mat (1994)
 Mord i Gamla stan (2002)
 Mord på menyn (2003)

Other publications 
 32 om kärlek (1970), poems
 Drottningholm - slottet vid vattnet (1985), essay
 Sverige (1986)
 Slottet i staden (1989)
 Arvfurstens palats (1991), essay
 Kungliga svenska konstnärer (1994)
 Residens - Svenska EU-ambassader (1997)
 Sofia Albertina - en prinsessas palats (1997), essay
 Att kyssa ett träd (2000), memoirs
 Beridna högvakten (2005)
 Kungliga Djurgården (2007)
 Oss håller inga bojor, oss binder inga band! (2013)
 Ridkonsten i Sverige – historien om hästarna, Strömsholm och mästarna (2015)

References 

1933 births
Living people
People from Uppsala
Writers from Uppland
Ambassadors of Sweden to Switzerland
Swedish crime fiction writers